Cocculus laurifolius, the laurel-leaved snail tree, is a medium-sized, shrubby evergreen tree of the genus Cocculus. It is native to the foothills of the Himalaya Mountains, China, Taiwan and Japan, where it commonly grows to a height of 25 ft, with an equal spread. In cultivation it can reach a similar size where conditions are favorable. Form is round-headed, with a medium to fast growth rate and a coarse texture. Leaves are ovate-lanceolate, about 6" long by 2" wide, with a spiral bud arrangement. Leaf color is medium green. This species is dioecious, with male and female flowers on separate plants. Flowers are insignificant: small, yellowish and appearing in spikes at leaf axils. Fruit is a small (6 mm) black drupe. With frequent shearing, plants may work well in a formal setting as a hedge or screen. Will take a wide range of sun and soil conditions within its temperature tolerance.

Gallery

References

laurifolius